Müller Glacier is a tributary glacier, flowing northeast from Millen Range to enter Pearl Harbor Glacier close northwest of Mount Pearson. Mapped by United States Geological Survey (USGS) from surveys and U.S. Navy air photos, 1960–64. Named by Advisory Committee on Antarctic Names (US-ACAN) for Dietland Müller-Schwarze, United States Antarctic Research Program (USARP) biologist at Hallett Station (1964–65), Cape Crozier (1969–70 and 1970–71), and Palmer Archipelago (1971–72). His wife, Christine Müller-Schwarze, joined him as a member of the biology research parties in the last three summer seasons.

See also
 List of glaciers in the Antarctic
 Glaciology

References

Glaciers of Victoria Land